Hrib is a former village in central Slovenia in the Municipality of Lukovica. It is now part of the village of Videm pri Lukovici. It is part of the traditional region of Upper Carniola and is now included in the Central Slovenia Statistical Region.

Geography
Hrib stands east of the main part of Videm pri Lukovici. It consists of two farms.

Name
The name Hrib is derived from the common noun hrib 'hill', referring to the physical location of the village. It is a common place name, shared by several settlements in Slovenia. Hrib stands on a hill that rises about  higher than the main part of Videm pri Lukovici.

History
Hrib had a population of 16 (in two houses) in 1900. Hrib was annexed by Videm pri Lukovici in 1953, ending its existence as a separate settlement.

References

External links

Hrib on Geopedia

Populated places in the Municipality of Lukovica
Former settlements in Slovenia